Naarda atrirena is a species of moth in the family Noctuidae first described by George Hampson in 1912.

References

Hypeninae
Moths described in 1912